The Hanna-Barbera New Cartoon Series, a.k.a. The New Hanna-Barbera Cartoon Series or The Wally Gator Show, was a syndicated television package of animated cartoon series produced by Hanna-Barbera Productions, starting in 1962. The show included three unrelated short cartoon segments featuring talking animal characters:
 Wally Gator
 Touché Turtle and Dum Dum
 Lippy the Lion and Hardy Har Har

The package consisted of 52 episodes, each with three individual segments and no bridge animation. Each individual cartoon segment, had its own opening theme and closing title.

The title The New Hanna-Barbera Cartoon series was an off-screen promotional title to distinguish this package from other Hanna-Barbera cartoons (such as The Ruff and Reddy Show, The Huckleberry Hound Show and The Yogi Bear Show, all of which had bridge animation between the cartoons) available at the time. For example, WGN-Channel 9 in Chicago ran the three segments in a half-hour timeslot under the name Wally Gator. In New York, WPIX-TV originally used the segments for a local series, Cartoon Zoo, featuring Milt Moss as host and "Zookeeper", with life-sized cutouts of the characters in "cages" as a backdrop.

The package was originally syndicated by Screen Gems, the TV division of Columbia Pictures. The Hanna-Barbera studio was later purchased by the Taft Broadcasting Company, which distributed the studio's product first through Taft-HB Program Sales, and later through Worldvision Enterprises. Over time, the studio regained control of many of its earlier productions and distributed them through Worldvision. The elements of The New Hanna-Barbera Cartoon Series were split up, with Wally Gator airing as a segment on Magilla Gorilla and Friends on USA Network's Cartoon Express from 1987 through 1991. Meanwhile, Touche Turtle and Lippy the Lion were part of another package of cartoons aired on The Family Channel. Following the purchase of the Hanna-Barbera library by Turner Entertainment, these shorts eventually appeared on Cartoon Network and later Boomerang.

Episode list

Home media 
The first episode of the three cartoons is on the DVD Saturday Morning Cartoons: 1960's - Vol. 2.

Wally Gator was released separately as a mod DVD from Warner Archive as Wally Gator: The Complete Series on June 25, 2019.

Lippy the Lion followed on July 9 as Lippy the Lion and Hardy Har Har: The Complete Series.

Touché Turtle has yet to be released by Warner Archive, though it was considered to be released soon after the other two; as of December 2022, Warner Archive has yet to announce a release for the series.

See also 
 List of works produced by Hanna-Barbera Productions
 List of Hanna-Barbera characters

References

External links 
 

1960s American animated television series
1960s American anthology television series
1962 American television series debuts
1963 American television series endings
American children's animated anthology television series
First-run syndicated television programs in the United States
English-language television shows
Television series by Hanna-Barbera
Television series by Screen Gems